The 1902 Melbourne Cup was a two-mile handicap horse race which took place on Tuesday, 4 November 1902.

Bobbie Lewis, the winning jockey would go on to win four Melbourne Cups.

This year was the forty-second running of the Melbourne Cup.

This is the list of placegetters for the 1902 Melbourne Cup.

See also

 Melbourne Cup
 List of Melbourne Cup winners
 Victoria Racing Club

References

External links
1902 Melbourne Cup footyjumpers.com

1902
Melbourne Cup
Melbourne Cup
20th century in Melbourne
1900s in Melbourne